The Energy Efficiency Rating (EER) is a score applied to dwellings in the Australian Capital Territory.  It ranges from zero to six system– the higher the number of stars, the better.  This is mandatory for all dwellings offered for sale in the ACT.

The term can also refer to a rating given to household goods sold in the EU.  The rating shown on a label displayed at the point of sale.

It is also a term relating to EU directive 2002/91/EC by which the energy efficiency of all buildings in England and Wales have to be stated when the building is sold as part of the Energy Performance Certificate.

References

External links
 ACT Planning and Land Authority - Energy efficiency for house sales
 EU Directive 2002/91/EC - Directive 2002/91/EC of the European Parliament and of the Council of 16 December 2002 on the energy performance of buildings
 Energy Rating Label Manufacturer

Energy conservation in Australia
Building energy rating